W. Watson and Son was an optical instrument maker. In 1837, the William Watson business was established in London for the manufacture of optical instruments. By the 1840s, the company moved into lanterns, slides and associated equipment. In 1868, the name was changed to W. Watson & Son and by this time were located at 313 High Holborn, London. In the 1870s, the company added photographic equipment and became known as a leading manufacturer of the Highest Class Photographic Instruments and Apparatus in England. Into the 1940s, the company remained at 313 High Holborn.

W. Watson and Sons

On 9 January 1881 William Watson died. In 1883, the name of the company was changed to W. Watson & Sons as the son, Charles Henry Watson joined the business. The 1883 Kelly's Business Directory listed both Charles Henry Watson and Henry Watson as associated with the Watson & Sons company located at 23 Walton Street, Aylesbury, England. In 1889, the company participated in the formation of a Photographic Trades Section of the London Chamber of Commerce. In 1894, the company exhibited scientific instruments at the Antwerp Exhibition.

In the 1890s, the business continued to grow and advertised in catalogues their factories for instruments, optical glass and cabinet work located at Fullwood Rents W.C. The warehouse and show room remained at 313 High Holborn. In 1900, W. Watson & Sons purchased the John Browning & Co. In 1903, a section in the journal Knowledge lists an assortment of equipment available from the company: microscopes, astronomical telescopes (educational model for £5 1s), Crookes' spinthariscope (pocket model for £1 1s), and Electro-Therapeutics apparatus that included complete outfits for radiography from £30. The company also offered Finsen-type lamps.

W. Watson and Sons Ltd.
In 1908, the firm became W. Watson & Sons Ltd. On 10 August 1938, Charles Henry Watson died. In 1912, the company employed their equipment and demonstrated the utilization of alternating current electricity to enhance the growth of plants in a nursery near London. In 1929, an advertisement in the British Industries Fair Catalogue announced an Optical, Scientific and Photographic Exhibit. The exhibition featured manufacturers of microscopes for medical, industrial, and educational purposes and for the amateur, prism binoculars, astronomical and portable telescopes, photographic lenses and cameras, surveying and measuring instruments, photometers, and scientific apparatus of every description. The W. Watson & Son company exhibited in the Scientific Section at Stand No. N.24. In 1947, the firm was a Listed Exhibitor at the British Industries Fair. The Fair featured manufacturers of microscopes for all purposes and auxiliary optical and mechanical accessories. The company offered photometers, telescopes, prism binoculars, photographic lenses of all types, and optical elements in every form. W. Watson & Son exhibited in the Olympia Room, Ground Floor at Stand No. A.1020.

The company was also engaged c1930 to produce three prototype cipher typewriters designed and patented by Morgan O'Brien for evaluation by the military.

Medical electrology and radiology
In January 1905, the display of apparatus at the Annual Meeting and Exhibition of the British Electrotherapeutic Society was quite remarkable. Those in attendance were treated to items and displays of much interest, several items on display for the first time. High frequency apparatus was featured to a lesser extent than shown in previous years, but appliances for Röntgen ray work were plentiful. Excerpt from the Exhibit handbook follows:
W. Watson & Sons (313, High Holborn, W.C.).

Exhibition of 1905
Other companies that attended the Annual Meeting and Exhibition of the British Electrotherapeutic Society in January 1905:
Harry W. Cox, Limited at 1A, Rosebery Avenue, W.C.
A.E. Dean at 82, Hatton Garden, E.C.
The Medical Supply Association at 228, Gray's Inn Road, W.C.
Leslie Miller at 93, Hatton Garden, E.C.
Messrs. Newton & Co. at 3, Fleet Street, London
Sanitas Electrical Co. at 33 and 7A., Soho Square
Mr. Karl Friedrich Schall at 75, Cavendish Street, W.

People linked to W. Watson and Son
William Watson (c.1815–1881) – partner, 1868–1881
George Watson (1857-after 1881) – partner, 1881
Thomas Watson (1855–1897) – partner, 1890s–1897
Charles Watson (1866–1938) – partner, 1930s–1938
Harold Armytage Sanders (1867–1940) – employee, c.1881–1900
Alexander Eugen Conrady (1866–1944) – scientific adviser and lens designer, c.1901–1917
Harry Arthur Crowhurst (1868–1943) – employee, 1900s–1900
G.P. Norman (fl.1890s–1900s) – employee, 1890s–1897
Jasper Redfern (1871–1928) – photographer's apprentice, and later, agent, 1885–1895

Known locations/addresses
1888–1958, business address at: 313 High Holborn, London WC1, England
1890, factory at: 9, 10, 11, 16, 17 Fulwood's Rents, London, England
1890–1891, branch office at: 251 Swanston Street, Melbourne, Victoria, Australia
1897–1901, business address at: 78 Swanston Street, Melbourne, Victoria, Australia
1901, business address at: 16 Forrest Road, Edinburgh, Midlothian, Scotland
1914–1939, factory at: Bell's Hill, High Barnet, Hertfordshire, England
1914, business address at: 184 Great Portland Street, London W, England
1939–1950, factory at: 25 West End Lane, Barnet, Hertfordshire, England
1959–1969, business address at: Barnet, Hertfordshire, England

References

External links
W. Watson and Son camera wiki
 A microscope by Watson & Son
Manufacturing companies established in 1837
Optical instruments
X-ray equipment manufacturers
Microscopes
Microscope components
Telescope manufacturers
Scientific equipment
X-ray pioneers
1837 establishments in England